Leonard Smith (29 January 1911 – 14 June 2000) was an English professional rugby league footballer who played in the 1930s.

Background
Len Smith was born in Leeds, West Riding of Yorkshire, England, and he died aged 89 in Halifax, West Yorkshire, England.

Playing career

International honours
While at Hunslet, Smith played , and scored 2 tries in England's 15-15 draw with France at Stade de Paris on Thursday 28 March 1935 in front of a 20,000 crowd.

Challenge Cup Final appearances
Smith played , and scored a try in Hunslet's 11-5 victory over Widnes in the 1933–34 Challenge Cup Final during the 1933–34 season at Wembley Stadium, London on Saturday 5 May 1934.

References

External links

1911 births
2000 deaths
England national rugby league team players
English rugby league players
Hunslet F.C. (1883) players
Rugby league hookers
Rugby league players from Leeds
Rugby league props